Hakea eyreana, commonly known as straggly corkbark, is a tree in the family  Proteacea  and is endemic to  arid parts of inland Australia. It has needle-shaped leaves, greenish-yellow flowers and oblong to egg-shaped fruit.

Description
The tree is able to resprout from the base and has densely white-haired branchlets. It blooms from May to November and produces greenish-yellow flowers. The axillary inflorescences contain 35 to 105 greenish to yellow flowers. The seeds within take up most of valve and have a wing that goes half way along one side.

Taxonomy
The species was first formally identified by the botanist Donald McGillivray in 1975 as part of the work Australian Proteaceae: New taxa and notes as published in the journal Telopea.  The name is commonly misapplied to Hakea divaricata. The specific epithet is taken from the area in which the type specimen was collected near Lake Eyre which in turn is named in honour of the explorer Edward John Eyre.

Distribution
The tree is endemic to an area in the Simpson Desert and Channel Country in outback South Australia, New South Wales, Queensland and the Northern Territory where it is found on sand dunes, sand plains, swales and gibber flats growing in sandy or stony soils.

Uses 
The flowers contain a large amount of nectar, to the extent where it can be sipped from a straw. The nectar is also mixed with water to make a sweet drink.

References

eyreana
Flora of Queensland
Flora of New South Wales
Flora of South Australia
Flora of the Northern Territory
Plants described in 1975